Ljusne AIK FF is a Swedish football club located in Ljusne.

Background
Ljusne AIK FF currently plays in Division 4 Hälsingland which is the sixth tier of Swedish football. They play their home matches at the Ljusneborg in Ljusne.

The club is affiliated to Hälsinglands Fotbollförbund. In 1946–47 Ljusne AIK won the Norrländska Mästerskapet.  They were also runners-up in this competition in 1931–32 and 1949–50.

Season to season

In their most successful period Ljusne AIK FF competed in the following divisions:

In recent seasons Ljusne AIK FF have competed in the following divisions:

Footnotes

External links
 Ljusne AIK FF – Official website

Football clubs in Gävleborg County